AFWERX is a United States Air Force program with the goal of fostering a culture of innovation within the service. Encompassing a number of programs supported with relatively small amounts of funding, the initiative is intended to circumvent bureaucracy and engage new entrepreneurs in Air Force programs. AFWERX was officially announced by Air Force Secretary Heather Wilson on 21 July 2017 during her visit to Nellis Air Force Base. The program is partially based on the structure of Air Force Special Operations Command, and has been described as an "Island of misfit toys" for entrepreneurs in the Air Force. Secretary Wilson stated that the program would "increase lethality at a lower cost".

Purpose 
AFWERX is intended to engage inter and extra service innovators and entrepreneurs in the operations of the United States Air Force. The goal of the programs under the AFWERX umbrella is to develop effective solutions to the challenges facing the service through partnerships with private sector business entities, with particular emphasis being placed on collaboration with technology startups.

Technology accelerator 
Through AFWERX, the Air Force launched a technology accelerator program in September 2017. The technology accelerator program emphasizes the development and implementation of autonomous technologies. The goal of these developments is to increase the ability of the Air Force assets to detect, identify, attribute, and mitigate autonomous technologies. Boston based company PBTS LLC and entrepreneur networking service Techstars were contracted to operate the first accelerator program in conjunction with AFWERX.

Locations 
The first functioning AFWERX location was announced to be opening at the University of Nevada, Las Vegas in 2018, where, according to the Air Force, groups will be able to present ideas for evaluation by the service branch. The Vegas location opened in early June 2018. AFWERX opened a new facility in Austin, Texas also in June 2018, and later opened a third location in Washington D.C.

Initiatives

HSVTOL Challenge 
This challenge is to develop innovative designs for high-speed vertical take-off and landing aircraft. It launched in June 2021. The intent is to leapfrog the capabilities of the current VTOL aircraft, helicopters like the Sikorsky HH-60 Pave Hawk and the Bell Boeing V-22 Osprey, which have maximum speeds less than 400 mph.

Desired items include jet-like speed, in-flight transition between hover and cruise, increased range and endurance, in-flight refueling capability, and flexible payload. Designs that fit on a standard pallet, or offer smart collision and threat avoidance systems received extra credit.

35 submissions moved to the second stage of 218 original submissions.

Agility Prime 
Agility Prime is a program designed to partner with the commercial aviation industry and bring air taxis, or electric vertical take-off and landing (eVTOL) aircraft, to urban settings. The aerospace market is estimated to be $1.5T by 2040. The Agility Prime program will drive innovative new approaches for transiting technology to the field: contracts, airworthiness, and testing. It has received over $1B in commercial investment as of December 2021.

See also
National Security Innovation Network
Air Force Research Lab

References 

Projects of the United States Air Force